"Why Can't It Wait 'Til Morning" is a song by Phil Collins from his second solo album Hello, I Must Be Going!. The song was the fourth UK single released from the album and was only released in the UK and Ireland. According to Collins, the song has its origins from sessions for Face Value around 1978-1979.

In 1994, jazz group Fourplay recorded a cover with Collins and released it on their album Elixir. They also later remixed the song.

Track listing

7": Virgin / VS 603 (UK)
"Why Can't It Wait 'Til Morning"
"Like China"

Charts

Credits 
 Phil Collins – acoustic piano, vocals
 Martyn Ford – orchestral arrangements and conductor 
 Gavyn Wright – orchestra leader 
 The Mountain Fjord Orchestra – strings and woodwinds

References

1983 singles
Rock ballads
Phil Collins songs
Virgin Records singles
Song recordings produced by Phil Collins
Song recordings produced by Hugh Padgham
1982 songs
Atlantic Records singles
Songs written by Phil Collins
1980s ballads